Astafei is a Romanian surname. Notable people with the surname include:

Alina Astafei (born Galina Astafei in 1969), Romanian-born German track and field athlete 
Victoraș Astafei (born 1987), Romanian footballer 

Romanian-language surnames